Ross River Airport  is located  south of Ross River, Yukon, Canada.

References

Registered aerodromes in Yukon